Jennifer Rogers may refer to:
Jennifer Rogers, British statistician
Jennifer Rogers, member of indie rock band The Rogers Sisters
Jennifer Rogers, Conservative candidate in 1999 Bristol City Council election
Jennifer Rogers, player for Liverpool Feds in 2018–19 FA Women's National League Cup
Jennifer Rogers, wife of Fred Griffith (actor)
Jennifer Rogers, wife of 30 Rock TV show producer Robert Carlock
Jennifer Rogers, fictional character on TV episode St. Valentine's Day (30 Rock)
Jennifer Rogers, fictional character played by Shirley MacLaine in 1955 film The Trouble With Harry
Jennifer Rogers, fictional character in 1998 film Primary Colors